German submarine U-3002 was a Type XXI U-boat (one of the "Elektroboote") of Nazi Germany's Kriegsmarine, built for service in World War II. She was ordered on 6 November 1943, and was laid down on 23 May 1944 at AG Weser, Bremen as yard number 1161. She was launched on 9 July 1944, and commissioned under the command of Kapitänleutnant Helmut Manseck on 6 August 1944.

Design 
Like all Type XXI U-boats, U-3002 had a displacement of  when at the surface and  while submerged. The submarine was powered by two MAN SE supercharged six-cylinder M6V40/46KBB diesel engines each providing , two Siemens-Schuckert GU365/30 double-acting electric motors each providing , and two Siemens-Schuckert silent running GV232/28 electric motors each providing .

U-3002 was fitted with six  torpedo tubes in the bow and four  C/30 anti-aircraft guns. She could carry twenty-three torpedoes or seventeen torpedoes and twelve mines. The complement was five officers and fifty-two men.

Fate 
U-3002 was scuttled on 2 May 1945, at Travemünde, as part of Operation Regenbogen. The wreck was later raised and broken up.

References

Bibliography

External links 
 

1944 ships
Maritime incidents in May 1945
Operation Regenbogen (U-boat)
Ships built in Bremen (state)
Type XXI submarines
U-boats commissioned in 1944
World War II submarines of Germany